Merlinettes was the colloquial name given to the women of the  (CFT, "Women's Signal Corps") of the French army during World War II. 

The Merlinettes took part in most campaigns of the Liberation of France, from the landing in Provence to the  Allied advance from Paris to the Rhine as well as the Italian campaign. Their nickname was derived from Colonel Merlin, the creator of the corps who formed the unit in French Algeria during the winter of 1942. 

In April 1944 about 1,095 women were serving in the Corps reaching a peak by the end of the war of over 2,000. They are considered the first female soldiers of the French army.

Formation history
The corps was formed on 22 November 1942, six months after the establishment of the signals arm under Colonel Lucien Merlin as part of Admiral Giraud's forces in French Algeria. Lucien Merlin, proposed to integrate women into the communications service: until then women had been forbidden by law to serve in the army. The candidates were nicknamed Merlinettes, in reference to the founder of the corps.

The work of the Merlinettes included telephone operators, signals analysts, teletype and radio operators.

In 1944 they became officially part of Charle de Gaulle's Free French Forces. They took part in most Free French campaigns including the Italian campaign, after landing in Naples as part of the French Expeditionary Corps, and the Allied landing in Provence, Operation Dragoon, following the Allied advance from Paris to the Rhine.

At the beginning of 1944, thirty Merlinettes were sent to London for further commando training with the Special Operations Executive. Eleven were subsequently sent on missions. After being parachuted into France in the spring of 1944, four of them, Suzanne Mertzizen, Marie-Louise Cloarec, Eugénie Djendi and Pierrette Louin, were captured, interrogated and sent to the Ravensbrück concentration camp where they were executed by the Germans on 18 January 1945.

On 13 May 2021 the French newspaper  published an article about the last living Merlinette, Colette Escoffier-Martini.

See also
 Suzanne Mertzizen
 Marie-Louise Cloarec
 Eugénie Djendi
 Pierrette Louin

References

External links
 French Ministry of Defence, Les Merlinettes (in French)

Military units and formations established in 1942
Military units and formations disestablished in 1945
French women in World War II
Female resistance members of World War II